Justice Moore may refer to:

Alfred Moore (1755–1810), associate justice of the United States Supreme Court
Andrew G. T. Moore II (1935–2018), associate justice of the Delaware Supreme Court
C. Edwin Moore (fl. 1960s–1970s), associate justice of the Iowa Supreme Court
Charles Page Thomas Moore (1831–1904), associate justice of the Supreme Court of Appeals of West Virginia
Dan K. Moore (1906–1986), associate justice of the North Carolina Supreme Court
Daniel A. Moore Jr. (1933–2022), associate justice of the Alaska Supreme Court
Frank A. Moore (1844–1918), chief justice of the Oregon Supreme Court
George F. Moore (judge) (1822–1883), justice of the Texas Supreme Court
James E. Moore (judge) (born 1936), associate justice of the South Carolina Supreme Court
Joseph B. Moore (Michigan judge) (1845–1930), associate justice of the Michigan Supreme Court
Ostis Otto Moore (1896–1990), chief justice of the Colorado Supreme Court
Roy Moore (born 1947), chief justice of the Supreme Court of Alabama
W. F. Moore (1868–1956), associate justice of the Texas Supreme Court

See also
Nicholas More (died 1689), first chief justice of the Province of Pennsylvania